Torrealba is a surname, and may refer to:
Annae Torrealba (born 1975), Venezuelan singer
Daniela Torrealba (born 1989), Venezuelan model
 Honorio Torrealba (1950-2010), Venezuelan comedian
Irania Torrealba (born 1953), Venezuelan architect
José Torrealba (born 1980), Venezuelan football striker 
 José Francisco Torrealba (1896-1973), Venezuelan microbiologist
Juan Vicente Torrealba (born 1917), Venezuelan musician and composer
Jesús Torrealba (born 1958), Venezuelan politician
Moisés Torrealba (born 1978), Venezuelan musician 
Pablo Torrealba (born 1948), Venezuelan baseball player
Manuel Torrealba Lossi (born 1927), Venezuelan poet and writer 
Rafael Torrealba  (born 1953),  Venezuelan  jockey
Steve Torrealba (born 1978), Venezuelan baseball player
Witremundo Torrealba (1935-1981), Venezuelan microbiologist
Yorvit Torrealba (born 1978), Venezuelan baseball player
Alberto Arvelo Torrealba (1905 - 1971), Venezuelan lawyer, educator and poet
Mariángel Ruiz Torrealba (born 1980), Venezuelan actress and show hostees